The Legislative Council of British Columbia held its second election in 1869. BC was a colony formed by the union of the colony of Vancouver Island and the colony of British Columbia..

Members elected:
William Weir Carrall, Cariboo
John C. Davie, Victoria District
Montague William Tyrwhitt Drake, Victoria City
Henry Havelock, Yale
John Sebastian Helmcken, Victoria City
Thomas Basil Humphreys, Lillooet
David Babington Ring, Nanaimo
John Robson, New Westminster

The governor appointed 13 more members to the legislative council.

See also  
 History of British Columbia#Colonial British Columbia (1858–1871)

References 

1869
1869 elections in North America
1869 in British Columbia